Wünsche is a German surname.

People
August Wünsche (1838–1912), German Christian Hebraist
Florian Wünsche (born 1991), German actor
Gert Wünsche (born 1943), German footballer
Kurt Wünsche (born 1929), German politician and twice Minister of Justice of the German Democratic Republic
Max Wünsche (1914–1995), regimental commander in the Waffen-SS during World War II
Vilém Wünsche (1900–1984), Czech painter, graphic artist and illustrator

See also 
Die tödlichen Wünsche, opera by Giselher Klebe
Wünsche fliegen übers Meer, eleventh studio album released by German Schlager group Die Flippers

German-language surnames
Surnames of German origin